The men's 800 metres at the 2014 European Athletics Championships took place at the Letzigrund on 12, 13, and 15 August.

Medalists

Records

Schedule

Results

Round 1

First 3 in each heat (Q) and 4 best performers (q) advance to the Semifinals.

Semifinals
First 3 in each heat (Q) and 2 best performers (q) advance to the Final.

Final

References

Results

800 M
800 metres at the European Athletics Championships